Kudhar is a large village situated in the Kasganj district (Former Kasganj Tehsil of Kanshiram Nagar district) of Uttar Pradesh, India. According to Population Census 2011, Kudhar village is house of 619 families with a total population of 3730 of which 2032 are males while 1698 are females.

Kudhar has a lower literacy rate of  53.49%, lower than the Uttar Pradesh average literacy rate of  67.68%: male literacy is 70.25% and female literacy is 32.59%.

Agriculture is the main occupation of villagers.

Transport
Kudhar is well linked to other parts of the district by means of public and private Bus, Jeep transport. The nearest railway stations are Kasganj Junction which is 17.5 km away. The closest airport is situated in Agra which is famous as Kheria Airport (100 km Approx.)

Education
There is Primary government school in Kudhar & higher secondary school named as Nawabpur Inter College in next village Nawabpur.

References 

Villages in Kasganj district